Al Shaver is a Canadian sportscaster who covered the Minnesota North Stars. He won the Foster Hewitt Memorial Award in 1993 and is a member of the media section of the Hockey Hall of Fame. He is also a member of the Minnesota Broadcasting Hall of Fame.

Shaver attended the Lorne Greene Academy of Radio Arts in Toronto, graduating in 1948. He was a play-by-play announcer for radio and television stations in Guelph, Ontario (CJOY), Calgary, Alberta (CJCJ), Medicine Hat, Alberta (CHAT), Edmonton, Alberta (CFRN), Montreal, Quebec (CKGM), Windsor, Ontario (CKWW) and Toronto (CKEY) prior to becoming the North Stars' broadcaster in 1967 on WCCO Radio and later KSTP-AM and WAYL-AM.

Shaver did not follow the North Stars when they moved to Dallas in 1993, opting to stay in the Twin Cities. He called University of Minnesota men's hockey for several seasons, then retired in 1996. Shaver came out of retirement for one season in 2000, when the NHL returned to Minnesota with the debut of the Minnesota Wild, calling their games during their inaugural season in 2000-01.  His son, Wally, and grandson Jason are also sportscasters. The press box at the Xcel Energy Center, home of the Minnesota Wild, is named after Al Shaver.

He resides in Qualicum Beach, British Columbia, and is married to Shirley.

References

Year of birth missing (living people)
Living people
Canadian radio sportscasters
Foster Hewitt Memorial Award winners
Minnesota North Stars announcers
Minnesota Wild announcers
National Hockey League broadcasters
Major Indoor Soccer League (1978–1992) commentators
People from London, Ontario